Languria mozardi, the clover stem borer, is a species of lizard beetle in the family Erotylidae. Red and black, its length ranges from 4mm to 9mm. Adults may be found on a variety of plants, but its larvae develop in the stems of Trifolium pratense. It is found in Central America and North America.

Subspecies
These two subspecies belong to the species Languria mozardi:
 Languria mozardi mozardi Latreille, 1807
 Languria mozardi occidentalis Vaurie, 1950

References

Further reading

External links

 

Erotylidae
Articles created by Qbugbot
Beetles described in 1807